Tulsi or Ocimum tenuiflorum, commonly known as holy basil, is an aromatic perennial plant.

Tulsi may also refer to:

Tulsi (name), a given name and surname
Tulsi (film), a 2008 Indian film
Tulsi Comics, a defunct Indian comics publisher
Tulsi Express, an Indian Railways train
Tulsi Lake, a lake in Mumbai, India

See also
 Tulsi in Hinduism
 Tulsi Vivah, a Hindu ritual